The Korean Demilitarized Zone is a strip of land running across the Korean Peninsula near the 38th parallel north. The demilitarized zone (DMZ) is a border barrier that divides the peninsula roughly in half. It was established to serve as a buffer zone between the countries of North Korea and South Korea under the provisions of the Korean Armistice Agreement in 1953, an agreement between North Korea, China, and the United Nations Command.

There have been various incidents in and around the DMZ, with military and civilian casualties on both sides. Within the DMZ is a meeting point between the two nations, where negotiations take place: the small Joint Security Area (JSA) near the western end of the zone.

Location

The Korean Demilitarized Zone intersects but does not follow the 38th parallel north, which was the border before the Korean War. It crosses the parallel on an angle, with the west end of the DMZ lying south of the parallel and the east end lying north of it.

Though the zone is demilitarized, the border beyond that strip is one of the most heavily militarized borders in the world. The Northern Limit Line, or NLL, is the disputed maritime demarcation line between North and South Korea in the Yellow Sea, not agreed in the armistice. The coastline and islands on both sides of the NLL are also heavily militarized.

History

The 38th parallel north—which divides the Korean Peninsula roughly in half—was the original boundary between the United States and Soviet Union's brief administration areas of Korea at the end of World War II. Upon the creation of the Democratic People's Republic of Korea (DPRK, informally "North Korea") and the Republic of Korea (ROK, informally "South Korea") in 1948, it became a de facto international border and one of the most tense fronts in the Cold War.

Both the North and the South remained dependent on their sponsor states from 1948 to the outbreak of the Korean War. That conflict, which claimed over three million lives and divided the Korean Peninsula along ideological lines, commenced on 25 June 1950, with a full-front DPRK invasion across the 38th parallel, and ended in 1953 after international intervention pushed the front of the war back to near the 38th parallel.

The Military Demarcation Line (MDL) goes through the center of the DMZ and indicates where the front was when the agreement was signed.

Owing to this theoretical stalemate, and genuine hostility between the North and the South, large numbers of troops are stationed along both sides of the line, each side guarding against potential aggression from the other side, even  years after its establishment. The armistice agreement explains exactly how many military personnel and what kind of weapons are allowed in the DMZ. Soldiers from both sides may patrol inside the DMZ, but they may not cross the MDL. However, heavily armed ROK soldiers patrol under the aegis of military police, and they have memorized each line of the armistice.  Sporadic outbreaks of violence killed over 500 South Korean soldiers, 50 American soldiers and 250 North Korean soldiers along the DMZ between 1953 and 1999.

Daeseong-dong (also written Tae Sung Dong), in South Korea, and Kijŏng-dong (also known as the "Peace Village"), in North Korea, are the only settlements allowed by the armistice committee to remain within the boundaries of the DMZ. Residents of Tae Sung Dong are governed and protected by the United Nations Command and are generally required to spend at least 240 nights per year in the village to maintain their residency. In 2008, the village had a population of 218 people. The villagers of Tae Sung Dong are direct descendants of people who owned the land before the 1950–53 Korean War.

To continue to deter North Korean incursion, in 2014 the United States government exempted the Korean DMZ from its pledge to eliminate anti-personnel landmines. On 1 October 2018, however, a 20-day process began to remove landmines from both sides of the DMZ.

Joint Security Area

Inside the DMZ, near the western coast of the peninsula, Panmunjeom is the home of the Joint Security Area (JSA). Originally, it was the only connection between North and South Korea but that changed on 17 May 2007, when a Korail train went through the DMZ to the North on the new Donghae Bukbu Line built on the east coast of Korea. However, the resurrection of this line was short-lived, as it closed again in July 2008 following an incident in which a South Korean tourist was shot and killed.

The JSA is the location of the famous Bridge of No Return, over which prisoner exchanges have taken place. There are several buildings on both the north and the south side of the Military Demarcation Line (MDL), and there have been some built on top of it. All negotiations since 1953 have been held in the JSA, including statements of Korean solidarity, which have generally amounted to little except a slight decline of tensions.

Within the JSA are a number of buildings for joint meetings called Conference Rooms. The MDL goes through the conference rooms and down the middle of the conference tables where the North Koreans and the United Nations Command (primarily South Koreans and Americans) meet face to face.

Facing the Conference Row buildings are the North Korean Panmungak and the South Korean Freedom House. In 1994, North Korea enlarged Panmungak by adding a third floor. In 1998, South Korea built a new Freedom House for its Red Cross staff and to possibly host reunions of families separated by the Korean War. The new building incorporated the old Freedom House Pagoda within its design.

Since 1953 there have been occasional confrontations and skirmishes within the JSA. The axe murder incident in August 1976 involved the attempted trimming of a tree which resulted in two deaths (Captain Arthur Bonifas and First Lieutenant Mark Barrett). Another incident occurred on 23 November 1984, when a Soviet tourist named Vasily Matuzok (sometimes spelled Matusak), who was part of an official trip to the JSA (hosted by the North), ran across the MDL shouting that he wanted to defect. UN Command Security Battalion records report that as many as 30 North Koreans followed him across the border. North Korean troops immediately chased after him, opening fire. Border guards on the South Korean side returned fire, eventually surrounding the North Koreans as they pursued Matusak. One South Korean and three North Korean soldiers were killed in the action, and Matusak was not captured.

In late 2009, South Korean forces in conjunction with the United Nations Command began renovation of its three guard posts and two checkpoint buildings within the JSA compound. Construction was designed to enlarge and modernize the structures. Work was undertaken a year after North Korea finished replacing four JSA guard posts on its side of the MDL. On 15 October, 2018, during the high-level talks in Panmunjeom, military officials of the rank of colonel from the two Koreas and Burke Hamilton, Secretary of the UNC Military Armistice Commission, announced measures to reduce conventional military threats, such as creating buffer zones along their land and sea boundaries and a no-fly zone above the border, removing 11 front-line guard posts by December, and demining sections of the Demilitarized Zone.

Villages

Both North and South Korea maintain peace villages in sight of each other's side of the DMZ. In the South, Daeseong-dong is administered under the terms of the DMZ. Villagers are classed as Republic of Korea citizens, but are exempt from paying tax and other civic requirements such as military service. In the North, Kijŏng-dong features a number of brightly painted, poured-concrete multi-story buildings and apartments with electric lighting. These features represented an unheard-of level of luxury for rural Koreans, North or South, in the 1950s. The town was oriented so that the bright blue roofs and white sides of the buildings would be the most distinguishing features when viewed from the border. However, based on scrutiny with modern telescopic lenses, it has been claimed the buildings are mere concrete shells lacking window glass or even interior rooms, with the building lights turned on and off at set times and the empty sidewalks swept by a skeleton crew of caretakers in an effort to preserve the illusion of activity.

Flagpoles

In the 1980s, the South Korean government built a  flag pole in Daeseong-dong, which flies a South Korean flag weighing . It flies a  flag of North Korea.

DMZ-related incidents and incursions

Since demarcation, the DMZ has had numerous cases of incidents and incursions by both sides, although the North Korean government typically never acknowledges direct responsibility for any of these incidents (there are exceptions, such as the axe incident). This was particularly intense during the Korean DMZ Conflict (1966–1969) when a series of skirmishes along the DMZ resulted in the deaths of 43 American, 299 South Korean and 397 North Korean soldiers. This included the Blue House Raid in 1968, an attempt to assassinate South Korea President Park Chung Hee at the Blue House.

In 1976, in now-declassified meeting minutes, U.S. deputy secretary of defense William Clements told U.S. secretary of state Henry Kissinger that there had been 200 raids or incursions into North Korea from the south, though not by the U.S. military. Details of only a few of these incursions have become public, including raids by South Korean forces in 1967 that had sabotaged about 50 North Korean facilities.

Incursion tunnels

Since 15 November 1974, South Korea has discovered four tunnels crossing the DMZ that had been dug by North Korea. The orientation of the blasting lines within each tunnel indicated they were dug by North Korea. North Korea claimed that the tunnels were for coal mining; no coal was found in the tunnels, which were dug through granite. Some of the tunnel walls were painted black to give the appearance of anthracite.

The tunnels are believed to have been planned as a military invasion route by North Korea. They run in a north–south direction and do not have branches. Following each discovery, engineering within the tunnels has become progressively more advanced. For example, the third tunnel sloped slightly upwards as it progressed southward, to prevent water stagnation. Today, visitors from the south may visit the second, third and fourth tunnels through guided tours.

First tunnel
The first of the tunnels was discovered on 20 November 1974, by a South Korean Army patrol, noticing steam rising from the ground. The initial discovery was met with automatic fire from North Korean soldiers. Five days later, during a subsequent exploration of this tunnel, US Navy Commander Robert M. Ballinger and ROK Marine Corps Major Kim Hah-chul were killed in the tunnel by a North Korean explosive device. The blast also wounded five Americans and one South Korean from the United Nations Command.

The tunnel was reinforced with concrete slabs and had electric power and lighting. There were weapon storage areas and sleeping areas. A narrow-gauge railway with carts had also been installed. Estimates based on the tunnel's size suggest it would have allowed considerable numbers of soldiers to pass through it.

Second tunnel
The second tunnel was discovered on 19 March 1975. It is of similar length to the first tunnel.

Third tunnel

The third tunnel was discovered on 17 October 1978. Unlike the previous two, the third tunnel was discovered following a tip from a North Korean defector. Foreign visitors touring the South Korean DMZ may view inside this tunnel using a sloped access shaft.

Fourth tunnel

A fourth tunnel was discovered on 3 March 1990, north of Haean town in the former Punchbowl battlefield. The method of construction is almost identical in structure to the second and the third tunnels.

Korean wall

According to North Korea, between 1977 and 1979, the South Korean and United States authorities constructed a concrete wall along the DMZ. North Korea, however, began to propagate information about the wall after the fall of the Berlin Wall in 1989, when the symbolism of a wall unjustly dividing a people became more apparent.

Various organizations, such as the North Korean tour guide company Korea Konsult, claimed a wall was dividing Korea, saying that:

In December 1999, Chu Chang-jun, North Korea's ambassador to China, repeated claims that a "wall" divided Korea. He said the south side of the wall is packed with soil, which permits access to the top of the wall and makes it effectively invisible from the south side. He also claimed that it served as a bridgehead for any northward invasion.

The United States and South Korea deny the wall's existence, although they do claim there are anti-tank barriers along some sections of the DMZ. Dutch journalist and filmmaker Peter Tetteroo also shot footage of a barrier in 2001 which his North Korean guides said was the Korean Wall.

A 2007 Reuters report revealed that there is no coast to coast wall located across the DMZ and that the pictures of a "wall" which have been used in North Korean propaganda have merely been pictures of concrete anti-tank barriers. While 800,000 landmines were being removed in 2018, it was shown that the Joint Security Area along the Korean border was guarded by standard barbed wire.

North Korean side of the DMZ

The North Korean side of the DMZ primarily serves to stop an invasion of North Korea from the south. It also stops North Korean citizens from defecting to South Korea.

From the armistice until 1972, approximately 7,700 South Korean soldiers and agents infiltrated into North Korea in order to sabotage military bases and industrial areas. Around 5,300 of them never returned home.

North Korea has thousands of artillery pieces near the DMZ. According to a 2018 article in The Economist, North Korea could bombard Seoul with over 10,000 rounds every minute. Experts believe that 60 percent of its total artillery is positioned within a few kilometers of the DMZ acting as a deterrent against any South Korean invasion.

Propaganda

Loudspeaker installations
From 1953 until 2004, both sides broadcast audio propaganda across the DMZ. Massive loudspeakers mounted on several of the buildings delivered DPRK propaganda broadcasts directed towards the south as well as propaganda radio broadcasts across the border. In 2004, the North and South agreed to end the broadcasts.

On 4 August 2015, a border incident occurred where two South Korean soldiers were wounded after stepping on landmines that had allegedly been laid on the southern side of the DMZ by North Korean forces near an ROK guard post. Both North Korea and South Korea then resumed broadcasting propaganda by loudspeaker.  After four days of negotiations, on 25 August 2015 South Korea agreed to discontinue the broadcasts following a statement from North Korea's government expressing regret for the landmine incident.

On 8 January 2016, in response to North Korea's supposed successful testing of a hydrogen bomb, South Korea resumed broadcasts directed at the North.  On 15 April 2016, it was reported that the South Koreans purchased a new stereo system to combat the North's broadcasts.

Balloons

Both North and South Korea have held balloon propaganda leaflet campaigns since the Korean War.

In recent years, mainly South Korean non-governmental organizations have been involved in launching balloons targeted at the DMZ and beyond. Due to the winds, the balloons tend to fall near the DMZ where there are mostly North Korean soldiers to see the leaflets. As with the loudspeakers, balloon operations were mutually agreed to be halted between 2004 and 2010. It has been assessed that the activists' balloons may contribute to the decay of remaining cooperation between the Korean governments, and the DMZ has become more militarized in recent years.

Many North Korean leaflets during the Cold War gave instructions and maps to help targeted South Korean soldiers in defecting. One of the leaflets found on the DMZ included a map of Cho Dae-hum's route of defection to North Korea across the DMZ. In addition to using balloons as a means of delivery, North Koreans have also used rockets to send leaflets to the DMZ.

Dismantling
On 23 April 2018, both North and South Korea officially cancelled their border propaganda broadcasts. On 1 May 2018, the loudspeakers across the Korean border were dismantled. Both sides also committed to ending the balloon campaigns. On 5 May 2018, an attempt by North Korean defectors to disperse more balloon propaganda across the border from South Korea was halted by the South Korean government. The no-fly zone which was established on 1 November 2018 also designated a no-fly zone for all aircraft types above the MDL, and prohibits hot-air balloons from traveling within 25 km of the Korean border's Military Demarcation Line (MDL).

Civilian Control Line

Its purpose is to limit and control the entrance of civilians into the area in order to protect and maintain the security of military facilities and operations near the DMZ. The commander of the 8th US Army ordered the creation of the CCL and it was activated and first became effective in February 1954.

The buffer zone that falls south of the Southern Limit Line is called the Civilian Control Zone. Barbed wire fences and manned military guard posts mark the Civilian Control Line. The Civilian Control Zone is necessary for the military to monitor civilian travel to tourist destinations close to the Southern Limit Line of the DMZ like the discovered infiltration tunnels and tourist observatories. Usually when traveling within the Civilian Control Zone, South Korean soldiers accompany tourist buses and cars as armed guards to monitor the civilians as well as to protect them from North Korean intruders.

Right after the ceasefire, the Civilian Control Zone outside the DMZ encompassed 100 or so empty villages. The government implemented migration measures to attract settlers into the area. As a result, in 1983, when the area delineated by the Civilian Control Line was at its largest, a total of 39,725 residents in 8,799 households were living in the 81 villages located within the Civilian Control Zone.

Most of the tourist and media photos of the "DMZ fence" are actually photos of the CCL fence. The actual DMZ fence on the Southern Limit Line is completely off-limits to everybody except soldiers, and it is illegal to take pictures of the DMZ fence. The CCL fence acts more as a deterrent for South Korean civilians from getting too close to the dangerous DMZ and is also the final barrier for North Korean infiltrators if they get past the Southern Limit Line DMZ fence.

Neutral Zone of the Han River Estuary
The whole estuary of the Han River is deemed a "Neutral Zone" and is off-limits to all civilian vessels and is treated like the rest of the DMZ. Only military vessels are allowed within this neutral zone.

According to the July 1953 Korean Armistice Agreement civil shipping was supposed to be permissible in the Han River estuary and allow Seoul to be connected to the Yellow Sea (West Sea) via the Han River. However, both Koreas and the UNC failed to make this happen. The South Korean government ordered the construction of the Ara Canal to finally connect Seoul to the Yellow Sea, which was completed in 2012. Seoul was effectively landlocked from the ocean until 2012. The biggest limitation of the Ara Canal is it is too narrow to handle any vessels except small tourist boats and recreational boats, so Seoul still cannot receive large commercial ships or passenger ships in its port.

In recent years Chinese fishing vessels have taken advantage of the tense situation in the Han River Estuary Neutral Zone and illegally fished in this area due to both North Korean and South Korean navies never patrolling this area due to the fear of naval battles breaking out. This has led to firefights and sinkings of boats between Chinese fishermen and South Korean Coast Guard.

On January 30, 2019, North Korean and South Korean military officials signed a landmark agreement that would open the Han River Estuary to civilian vessels for the first time since the Armistice Agreement in 1953. The agreement was scheduled to take place in April 2019 but the failure of the 2019 Hanoi Summit indefinitely postponed these plans.

Castle of Gung Ye
Within the DMZ itself, in the town of Cheorwon, is the old capital of the kingdom of Taebong (901–918), a regional upstart that became Goryeo, the dynasty that ruled a united Korea from 918 to 1392.

Taebong was founded by the charismatic leader Gung Ye, a brilliant if tyrannical one-eyed ex-Buddhist monk. Rebelling against the kingdom of Silla, Korea's then ruling dynasty, he proclaimed the kingdom of Taebong—also called Later Goguryeo, in reference to the ancient kingdom of Goguryeo (37 BCE – 668 CE)—in 901, with himself as king. The kingdom consisted of much of central Korea, including areas around the DMZ. He placed his capital in Cheorwon, a mountainous region that was easily defensible (in the Korean War, this same region would earn the name "the Iron Triangle").

As a former Buddhist monk, Gung Ye actively promoted the religion of Buddhism and incorporated Buddhist ceremonies into the new kingdom. Even after Gung Ye was dethroned by his own generals and replaced by Wang Geon, the man who would rule over a united Korea as the first king of Goryeo, this Buddhist influence would continue, playing a major role in shaping the culture of medieval Korea.

As the ruins of Gung Ye's capital lie in the DMZ itself, visitors cannot see them. Moreover, excavation work and research have been hampered by political realities. In the future, inter-Korean peace may allow for proper archaeological studies to be conducted on the castle site and other historical sites within and underneath the DMZ.

The ruins of the capital city of Taebong, the ruins of the castle of Gung Ye, and King Gung Ye's tomb all lie within the DMZ and are off-limits to everybody except soldiers who patrol the DMZ.

Transportation

Panmunjeom is the site of the negotiations that ended the Korean War and is the main center of human activity in the DMZ. The village is located on the main highway and near a railroad connecting the two Koreas.

The railway, which connects Seoul and Pyongyang, was called the Gyeongui Line before division in the 1940s.  Currently the South uses the original name, but the North refers to the route as the P'yŏngbu Line. The railway line has been mainly used to carry materials and South Korean workers to the Kaesong Industrial Region. Its reconnection has been seen as part of the general improvement in the relations between North and South in the early part of this century. However, in November 2008 North Korean authorities closed the railway amid growing tensions with the South. Following the death of former South Korean President Kim Dae-jung, conciliatory talks were held between South Korean officials and a North Korean delegation who attended Kim's funeral. In September 2009, the Kaesong rail and road crossing was reopened.

The road at Panmunjeom, which was known historically as Highway One in the South, was originally the only access point between the two countries on the Korean Peninsula. Passage is comparable to the strict movements that occurred at Checkpoint Charlie in Berlin at the height of the Cold War. Both North and South Korea's roads end in the JSA; the highways do not quite join as there is a  concrete line that divides the entire site. People given the rare permission to cross this border must do so on foot before continuing their journey by road.

In 2007, on the east coast of Korea, the first train crossed the DMZ on the new Donghae Bukbu (Tonghae Pukpu) Line. The new rail crossing was built adjacent to the road which took South Koreans to Mount Kumgang Tourist Region, a region of significant cultural importance for all Koreans. More than one million civilian visitors crossed the DMZ until the route was closed following the shooting of a 53-year-old South Korean tourist in July 2008. After a joint investigation was rebuffed by North Korea, the South Korean government suspended tours to the resort. Since then the resort and the Donghae Bukbu Line have effectively been closed by North Korea. Currently, the South Korean Korea Railroad Corporation (Korail) organizes tours to DMZ with special DMZ themed trains.

On 14 October 2018, North and South Korea, agreed to meet the summit's goal of restoring railway and road transportation, which had been cut since the Korean War, by either late November or early December 2018. Road and railway transportation along the DMZ were reconnected in November 2018, following the removal of the "frontline" guard posts and Arrowhead Hill landmines, railroad transportation between North and South Korea resumed. The same day, 30 officials from both North and South Korea started an 18-day survey of a 400-kilometer (248-mile) railroad section in North Korea alongside the DMZ between Kaesong and Sinuiju. Efforts to conduct the survey had previously been obstructed due to the presence of the guard posts and the Arrowhead Hill landmines. The survey will then follow the groundbreaking of a new railroad along the DMZ. The railway survey which involved the Gyeongui Line concluded on 5 December 2018.

On 8 December 2018, a South Korean bus crossed the DMZ into North Korea. The same day, the officials who conducted the inter-Korean survey for the Gyeongui Line began surveying the Donghae Line.

Nature reserve

In the past half century, the Korean DMZ has been a deadly place for humans, making habitation impossible. Only around the village of Panmunjom and more recently the Donghae Bukbu Line on Korea's east coast have there been regular incursions by people.

This natural isolation along the  length of the DMZ has created an involuntary park which is now recognized as one of the most well-preserved areas of temperate habitat in the world. In 1966 it was first proposed that the DMZ be turned into a national park.

There are over 6,000 species of animals og plants in the DMZ. The DMZ has over 100 endangered animal species of the 267 in Korea, as well as many endangered plant species, among the heavily fortified fences, landmines and listening posts. These animals include the endangered red-crowned crane (a staple of Asian art), the white-naped crane, critically endangered Korean fox and Asiatic black bear, and, potentially, the extremely rare Siberian tiger, Amur leopard, and endangered marine species such as Western Gray Whale. Ecologists have identified some 2,900 plant species, 70 types of mammals and 320 kinds of birds within the narrow buffer zone. Additional surveys are now being conducted throughout the region.

The DMZ owes its varied biodiversity to its geography, which crosses mountains, prairies, swamps, lakes, and tidal marshes. Environmentalists hope that the DMZ will be conserved as a wildlife refuge, with a well-developed set of objective and management plans vetted and in place. In 2005, CNN founder and media mogul Ted Turner, on a visit to North Korea, said that he would financially support any plans to turn the DMZ into a peace park and a UN-protected World Heritage Site.

The MAB National Committee of the Republic of Korea mentioned only the southern part of DMZ to be nominated since there was no response from Pyongyang when it requested Pyongyang to push jointly. North Korea is a member nation of the international coordinating council of UNESCO's Man and the Biosphere Programme, which designates Biosphere Reserves.

North Korea opposed the application as a violation of the armistice agreement during the council's meeting in Paris on 9 to 13 July 2011. The South Korean government's attempt to designate the Demilitarized Zone (DMZ) a UNESCO Biosphere Reserve was turned down at UNESCO's MAB council meeting in Paris in July 2012. Pyongyang expressed its opposition by sending letters to 32 council member countries, except for South Korea, and the UNESCO headquarters a month prior to the meeting. At the council meeting, Pyongyang said the designation violated the Armistice Agreement.

Destruction of guard posts

On 26 October 2018, South Korean major general Kim Do-gyun and North Korean lieutenant general An Ik-san met in Tongilgak (the "Unification Pavilion"), a North Korean building located within the DMZ's Joint Security Area (JSA). There, they began implementing new protocols which aim to reduce tension by requiring both North and South Korea to destroy 22 guard posts across the DMZ, among other steps. Both generals approved requirements for the guard posts to be destroyed by the end of November 2018. The JSA's guard posts were destroyed on 25 October 2018. North and South Korea agreed to dismantle 11 guard posts located within their individual country and deemed as "front-line". It was also agreed that after the posts are dismantled, both Koreas would also withdraw equipment and personnel stationed at each post as well. In tandem with the September 2018 Pyongyang and Military Domain Agreements, both sides also agreed to gradually remove all guard posts near the DMZ following verification in December 2018.

However, all remaining troops and equipment, including weapons, were withdrawn from all of the 22 "frontline" guard posts before destruction began and both Koreas later agreed to individually destroy 10 of these guard posts instead of 11.

On 4 November 2018, the North and South Korean governments hoisted a yellow flag above each of their 11 DMZ guard posts to publicly indicate that they all will be dismantled. On 10 November 2018, the withdrawal of military personnel and weapons from all of the DMZ's 22 "front-line" guard posts was completed. The destruction of 20 guard posts officially began on 11 November 2018. However, both Koreas amended the original agreement and decided to preserve 2 of the 22 now demilitarized frontline guard posts. Both of the posts which were planned to be preserved are located on the opposite sides of the Korean border.

On 15 November 2018, destruction of two DMZ guard posts, one being located in South Korea and the other located in North Korea, was completed. Work was still ongoing to complete the destruction of other guard posts as well. On 23 November 2018, it was revealed that South Korea was slowly destroying their guard posts with excavators.

On 20 November 2018, North Korea, hoping to further ease tensions with South Korea, destroyed all of their 10 remaining "frontline" guard posts. The South Korean Defense Ministry released photos confirming this and also released a statement stating that North Korea had informed them about the plans to demolish them before it took place. This came in accordance with the earlier agreements. South Korea also released videos of the guard posts being destroyed as well.

On 30 November 2018, both Koreas completed work to dismantle 10 of their "frontline" guard posts. However, the later agreement for each Korea to preserve one "frontline" post was upheld as well. The "frontline" guard post which was preserved on the North Korean side of the DMZ was visited by Kim Jong-un in 2013 when tensions were rising between both Koreas.

Establishment of buffer zones, no-fly zones and Yellow Sea peace zones
On 1 November 2018, buffer zones were established across the DMZ by the North and South Korean militaries. In compliance with the Comprehensive Military Agreement which was signed at the September 2018 inter-Korean summit, the buffer zone helps ensure that both North and South Korea will effectively ban hostility on land, air, and sea. Both Koreas are prohibited from conducting live-fire artillery drills and regiment-level field maneuvering exercises or those by bigger units within 5 kilometers of the Military Demarcation Line (MDL). The buffer zones stretch from the north of Deokjeok Island to the south of Cho Island in the West Sea and the north of Sokcho city and south of Tongchon County in the East (Yellow) Sea.

Hot-air balloons cannot travel within  of the DMZ as well. For fixed-wing aircraft, no fly zones are designated within  from the MDL in the East (between MDL Markers No. 0646 and 1292) and within  of the MDL in the West (between MDL Markers No. 0001 and 0646). For rotary-wing aircraft, the no fly zones are designated within  of the MDL.

Both Koreas also created "peace zones" near their disputed Yellow Sea border.

Reconnecting of MDL-crossing road
The road was reconnected for the first time in 14 years in an effort to assist with a process at the DMZ's Arrowhead Hill involving the removal of landmines and exhumation of Korean War remains.

Presence of landmines and Korean War remains
On 1 October 2018, North and South Korean military engineers began a scheduled 20 day removal process of landmines and other explosives planted across the DMZ's Joint Security Area of the (DMZ). Work to remove landmines from the Joint Security Area was completed on 25 October 2018. Demining had begun at the DMZ's Arrowhead Hill and resulted in the discovery of Korean War remains. Work between both Koreas to remove landmines from Arrowhead Hill was completed on 30 November 2018.

Military Border Crossing
On 12 December 2018, militaries from both Koreas crossed the DMZ's MDL into the opposition countries for the first time in history to inspect and verify the removal of "frontline" guard posts.

Meeting of Trump, Kim, and Moon at the DMZ

On 30 June 2019, U.S. president Donald Trump became the first sitting U.S. president to enter North Korea, doing so at the DMZ line. After crossing into North Korea, Trump and North Korean chairman Kim Jong-un met and shook hands.  Kim stated, in Korean, "It's good to see you again", "I never expected to meet you at this place" and "you are the first U.S. president to cross the border." Both men then briefly crossed the border line before crossing back into South Korea.

On the South Korean side of the DMZ, Kim, South Korean president Moon Jae-in, and Trump held a brief chat before holding an hour-long meeting at the DMZ's Inter-Korean House of Freedom.

Pilgrimages
An annual youth pilgrimage including a 6-day peace walk to the DMZ is organised by the Catholic Church. The first pilgrimage took place in 2012. Young people from 15 countries attended the 2019 pilgrimage. The 2022 pilgrimage included visits to the Ulleungdo and Dokdo islands.

See also
 Bamboo Curtain
 Iron Curtain
 List of border incidents involving North and South Korea
 Neutral Nations Supervisory Commission
 North Korea–South Korea relations
 Peace lines
 United Nations Buffer Zone in Cyprus
 Vietnamese Demilitarized Zone

Notes

References

 
 
 Elferink, Alex G. Oude, (1994). The Law of Maritime Boundary Delimitation: a Case Study of the Russian Federation. Dordrecht: Martinus Nijhoff. ; OCLC 123566768

External links

 Touring the DMZ in South Korea What it's like to stand at the border, 2017
 U.S. Army official Korean Demilitarized Zone image archive
 Washington Post Correspondent Amar Bakshi travels to the Korean Demilitarized Zone... And uncovers the world's most dangerous tourist trap, January 2008.
 Status and ecological resource value of the Republic of Korea's De-militarized Zone
 Tour Of DMZ on YouTube. Dec. 2007
 Tour of DMZ from the DPRK on YouTube, 2016
 360 degree tour of DMZ from the DPRK on YouTube, 2016
 DMZ Forum: Collaborative international NGO focusing on promoting peace and conservation within the Korean DMZ region
 ABCNews/Yahoo! report/blog on the DMZ
 The World’s Most Dangerous Border – A Tour of North Korea’s DMZ Visiting the DMZ from Pyongyang.
 Photo of road linking DPRK to Paju, ROK
 International Boundary Study No. 22 – May 24, 1963 Korea “Military Demarcation Line” Boundary 

1953 introductions
1953 establishments in Korea
Biosphere reserves of South Korea
Border barriers
Cold War terminology
Demilitarized zones
Government of North Korea
International borders
 
Military of North Korea
Military history of Korea
Military installations established in 1953
North Korea–South Korea border
North Korea–South Korea relations